South Sweden is a National Area of Sweden. The National Areas are a part of the NUTS statistical regions of Sweden.

Geography
South Sweden is situated in the southern part of its country. It is close to Denmark and it borders with the riksområden of Småland and the islands and West Sweden.

The most populous cities are Malmö, Helsingborg, Lund, Karlskrona, Kristianstad, Landskrona and Trelleborg.

Subdivision
South Sweden includes 2 counties: 
 Blekinge (seat: Karlskrona)
 Skåne (seat: Malmö)

Economy 
The Gross domestic product (GDP) of the region was 68.460 billion € in 2021, accounting for 12.6% of Swedish economic output. GDP per capita adjusted for purchasing power was 31,100 € or 103% of the EU27 average in the same year. The GDP per employee was also 103% of the EU average.

See also 
Greater Malmö
Götaland
NUTS statistical regions of Sweden
ISO 3166-2:SE
Administrative divisions of Sweden

References

External links

 
National Areas of Sweden
Götaland
NUTS 2 statistical regions of the European Union